The ice hockey team rosters at the 1960 Winter Olympics consisted of the following players:

Australia
Head coach:  Bud McEachern

Canada
Head coach: Bobby Bauer

Czechoslovakia
Head coach: Eduard Farda

Assistant coach: Ladislav Horský

Finland
Head coach:  Viljo Wirkkunen

Assistant coach: Aarne Honkavaara

Germany
Head coach: Karl Wild

Japan
Head coach: Hiroki Onikura

Soviet Union
Head coach: Anatoly Tarasov

Assistant coach: Vladimir Yegorov

Sweden 
Head coach:  Ed Reigle

United States
Head coach: Jack Riley

References

Sources

Hockey Hall Of Fame page on the 1960 Olympics

rosters
1960